The Other Side is a horror fiction novel co-authored by Faraaz Kazi and Vivek Banerjee.  The book, first published by Mahaveer Publishers in 2013, has the world's first animated book cover.
The book was launched by horror film maker, Vikram Bhatt in Mumbai along with Aftab Shivdasani, Tia Bajpai and Vidya Malavade.

Contents
The Other Side is composed of a foreword, prelude, 13 short stories, and epilogue sections.

References

2013 Indian novels
Indian horror fiction